Holmwood Township is a township in Jewell County, Kansas, USA.  As of the 2000 census, its population was 49.

Geography
Holmwood Township covers an area of 35.69 square miles (92.44 square kilometers); of this, 0.02 square miles (0.05 square kilometers) or 0.05 percent is water. The streams of Antelope Creek, Big Timber Creek, East Fork Big Timber Creek, Korb Creek, Long Branch, Lost Creek, Norway Creek, Oak Creek, Oak Creek, Porcupine Creek, Spring Creek and Troublesome Creek run through this township.

Adjacent townships
 Harrison Township (north)
 Montana Township (northeast)
 Richland Township (east)
 Washington Township (southeast)
 Center Township (south)
 Limestone Township (southwest)
 Burr Oak Township (west)
 Walnut Township (northwest)

References
 U.S. Board on Geographic Names (GNIS)
 United States Census Bureau cartographic boundary files

External links
 US-Counties.com
 City-Data.com

Townships in Jewell County, Kansas
Townships in Kansas